McDonald v Horn [1995] 1 All ER 961 is an English trusts law case on pensions, relevant for UK labour law. It enables the beneficiaries of a pension fund to be indemnified for costs in bringing actions for breach of trust, fiduciary duty or the duty of care against the trustees or directors of a pension fund.

Facts
McDonald and other members of a pension scheme claimed that their employers, pension fund trustees and others breached duties in the investment of the trust funds and use of their powers for improper purposes.

Judgment

High Court
Vinelott J held that a pre-emptive costs order would be made, where the costs of the beneficiaries, and costs they might be ordered to pay by the defendants should be paid on an indemnity basis out of the pension fund. The defendants appeal.

Court of Appeal
The Court of Appeal held that the appeal should be dismissed, and considering the court’s jurisdiction to deal with costs under the Supreme Court Act 1981 s 51, general principles under the RSC Ord.62 r.3 and special principles relating to trustees and other fiduciaries under Ord.62 r.6 there was an analogy between pensions as a special form of trust and companies with shareholders. Following Wallersteiner v Moir (No 2) a minority shareholder bringing a derivative action on behalf of a company was entitled to be indemnified out of the assets against his costs, and the same principle could legitimately be applied in the case of an action by a pension fund member with only limited means acting on behalf of many others who had an interest in the fund.

Hoffmann LJ said the following:

Balcombe LJ and Hirst LJ agreed.

See also

English trusts law
UK labour law
UK company law

Notes

References

English trusts case law